A brachiopod superfamily comprising the EIchwaldiidae and the Isogrammidae.

References

Brachiopod families